KV TOP (Korfbal Vereniging Tot Ons Plezier) is a Dutch korfball club located in Sassenheim, Netherlands. The club was founded on 12 July 1928 and they play their home games in sports accommodation De Korf. The team plays in white/red vertically striped shirts and black shorts / skirts.

History
During the nineties TOP made small steps to enter the elite korfball competition. 
When in 2005 a new elite indoor competition was founded, the Korfbal League  it took them 3 years to take part of this. Once the club entered this competition in 2008, they quickly emerged to the top, winning titles in 2011, 2014, 2016, 2017 and 2018.

Honours
 Dutch national champion indoor, 2x (2011 en 2015)
 Dutch national champion outdoor, 5x (2011, 2014, 2016, 2017, 2018)
 Europacup champion indoor, 5x (2012, 2015, 2017, 2018, 2019)
 Supercup champion outdoor, 1x (2015)

References

External links
 TOP Official website

Korfball teams in the Netherlands